Gentiana saponaria, the soapwort gentian or harvestbells, is a  tall flowering plant in the Gentianaceae family.

Description
Similar to the "bottle" gentians like Gentiana clausa and Gentiana andrewsii, it has paired, lanceolate leaves on unbranched stalks, blue or purple blooms, and a stout taproot. The flowers are pollinated by bumblebees.

Distribution and habitat
It is native to eastern North America south of the Great Lakes, from Wisconsin to New York, and south to Texas and Florida.  It is rare in its range, usually found in undisturbed sandy soils.

References

saponaria
Endemic flora of the United States
Flora of the Northeastern United States
Flora of the Southeastern United States
Flora of the North-Central United States
Flora of the Appalachian Mountains
Plants described in 1753
Taxa named by Carl Linnaeus